Aglaia fragilis is a species of plant in the family Meliaceae. It is endemic to Fiji.

References

fragilis
Vulnerable plants
Endemic flora of Fiji
Taxonomy articles created by Polbot